Basorge Tariah Jr. (born June 9, 1967) is a Nigerian actor and comedian.

Early life and education
Tariah Jr. is from Buguma, Kalabari, in Rivers State, Nigeria. Tariah Jr. has a Bachelor of Arts degree in Theatre Arts from the University of Port-Harcourt.

Career
Tariah Jr. made his first professional appearance as a stand-up comedian at the University of Port Harcourt in 1989, and was paid 171 naira ($24, per 1989 exchange rate) for the job. He has been described as an ace actor & Nollywood veteran by reputable Nigerian media house, The Punch. Tariah Jr. is best remembered for the character of Do Good in Zeb Ejiro’s award-winning soap opera Candle Light, featuring alongside Kate Henshaw.

Personal life
Tariah Jr. is married to Doris Basoene Tariah, and together they have four children. In 2017 the former governor of Rivers State, Rotimi Amaechi & current Nigerian minister of transportation (as of 2019) organized a birthday party for Tariah Jr for his 50th birthday.

Selected filmography
Run (2017)
Head Gone (2014)
The Meeting (2012)
Blood On Ice (2006)
Playing Games (2004)
Fools (2003)
Unforgeable (2003)
Runs! (2002)
My Guy (1999) 
Full Moon  (1998)
Domitilla  (1996) 
Silent Night (1996)

References

External links

Living people
1967 births
Nigerian male comedians
University of Port Harcourt alumni
People from Rivers State
Nigerian male television actors
20th-century Nigerian male actors
Nigerian comedians
21st-century Nigerian male actors